Gu Jingzhou  (18 October 1915 in Yixing, Jiangsu – 3 June 1996) was a Chinese ceramic artist who specialised in the creation of zisha-ware teapots. He was a founder and Deputy Director of Research and Technology at the Number One Yixing Factory.

Gu lived in Yixing, a city noted for its pottery. In his early career he worked for an antique dealer named Lang Yushu, and it was during this time that he was exposed to many pieces of classical zisha (purple clay) pottery, a style which he emulated in his own work. He wrote and researched the topic of zisha-ware extensively, and was granted the title "Master of Chinese Industrial Art".

Works by Gu are highly valued, and sell for as much as $2 million.

Gallery

Literature

References 

1915 births
1996 deaths
Chinese ceramists
People from Yixing
20th-century ceramists
Artists from Wuxi
People of the Republic of China